Douglass School may refer to:

Douglass School (Lexington, Kentucky), listed on the National Register of Historic Places in Fayette County, Kentucky
Douglass School (Lawton, Oklahoma), listed on the National Register of Historic Places in Comanche County, Oklahoma
Douglass School (Bristol, Virginia), listed on the National Register of Historic Places in Bristol, Virginia
Douglass School (Key West)

See also
Douglass High School (disambiguation)
 Douglas School